Before the Impact, or simply BTI, is a professional wrestling streaming television produced by the American promotion Impact Wrestling that premiered on February 16, 2021 on AXS TV in the United States, owned by parent company Anthem Sports & Entertainment. The show currently airs on Impact's streaming service, Impact Plus, as well as the promotion's YouTube channel and Facebook page.

BTI is a pre-show airing before the weekly broadcast of the promotion's flagship show, Impact!, that features recaps, previews, and an exclusive match.

History 
On February 10, 2021, Impact Wrestling announced the launch of a new program called Before the Impact, which will lead into the weekly Impact! broadcast. Josh Mathews serves as both senior producer and co-host, alongside Impact interviewer Gia Miller, and, previously, Nashville sportscaster Jon Burton. BTI features previews of upcoming matches, interviews with the Impact roster, behind-the-scenes access, and an exclusive match. Insider George Iceman hosts a segment called “Iceman’s Intel”, which features news relating to the upcoming Impact episode.

The first BTI match featured Decay (Black Taurus and Crazzy Steve) (accompanied by Rosemary) facing XXXL (Acey Romero and Larry D). BTI would first crossover with Impact! on their June 3 episodes, when Josh Alexander faced T. J. Perkins for the X Division Championship in Impact Wrestling's first-ever 60-minute Iron man match. The match began on BTI and concluded in the opening minutes of Impact!.

Personnel 

The wrestlers featured on BTI take part in scripted feuds and storylines. Wrestlers are portrayed as heroes, villains, or less distinguishable characters in scripted events that build tension and culminate in a wrestling match or series of matches.

Commentators

Broadcast history 
On April 8, 2021, BTI, along with Impact!, would move to Thursday nights.

Beginning with the January 20, 2022 episode, BTI moved to Impact Plus and Impact's YouTube channel and Facebook page. The move coincided with the return of New Japan Pro Wrestling programming to AXS TV.

References

External links 
 

Impact Wrestling
2021 American television series debuts
2021 in professional wrestling
2020s American television series
Impact Wrestling television shows
Anthem Sports & Entertainment